Cheng Jin (born 18 January 1995) is a Chinese footballer currently playing as a midfielder for Zhejiang.

Club career
Cheng Jin was born in Xinxiang in Henan where he played for his local primary school before moving to Zhejiang to continue his football development and work his way through the Zhejiang Professional youth team. He would be promoted to the senior team and go on to make his senior debut on 8 July 2015 in a Chinese FA Cup game against Henan Jianye in a 3-1 defeat. Soon after the game on 16 July 2015, Cheng would be loaned out to second tier club Wuhan Zall for six months.

At Wuhan he would make his debut on 25 July 2015 in a league game against Beijing Enterprises Group where he also scored his first professional goal in a 1-0 victory. After gaining significant playing time at Wuhan he would join them again the following season before returning to Zhejiang. At Zhejiang would make his league debut for them on 12 March 2017 against Neo Mongol Zhongyou in a 3-2 victory where he also scored his first goal for the club. He would go on to establish himself as a vital member of the team as they gained promotion to the top tier at the end of the 2021 China League One season through a play-off victory against Qingdao.

Career statistics

.

References

External links

1995 births
Living people
People from Xinxiang
Footballers from Henan
Chinese footballers
China youth international footballers
Association football midfielders
China League One players
Zhejiang Professional F.C. players
Wuhan F.C. players